Zhang Bian (born 29 August 1986) is a Chinese para table tennis player. She has won seven gold medals from three Paralympic Games (2008, 2012, 2016 and 2020).

Like many of her teammates, Zhang was a polio survivor from Pizhou who attended New Hope Center as a child. That's where coach Heng Xin developed her into a star.

References

1986 births
Living people
Table tennis players at the 2008 Summer Paralympics
Table tennis players at the 2012 Summer Paralympics
Table tennis players at the 2016 Summer Paralympics
Paralympic medalists in table tennis
Medalists at the 2016 Summer Paralympics
Medalists at the 2012 Summer Paralympics
Medalists at the 2008 Summer Paralympics
Chinese female table tennis players
Paralympic gold medalists for China
Paralympic table tennis players of China
Para table tennis players from Pizhou
People with polio
Table tennis players at the 2020 Summer Paralympics